Cynathea is a genus of African crab spiders that was first described by Eugène Louis Simon in 1895.  it contains three species: C. bicolor, C. mechowi, and C. obliterata.

See also
 List of Thomisidae species

References

Further reading

Araneomorphae genera
Spiders of Africa
Thomisidae